In chemistry, a pseudorotation is a set of intramolecular movements of attached groups (i.e., ligands) on a highly symmetric molecule, leading to a molecule indistinguishable from the initial one. The International Union of Pure and Applied Chemistry (IUPAC) defines a pseudorotation as a "[s]tereoisomerization resulting in a structure that appears to have been produced by rotation of the entire initial molecule", the result of which is a "product" that is "superposable on the initial one, unless different positions are distinguished by substitution, including isotopic substitution." 

Well-known examples are the intramolecular isomerization of trigonal bipyramidal compounds by the Berry pseudorotation mechanism, and the out-of-plane motions of carbon atoms exhibited by cyclopentane, leading to the interconversions it experiences between its many possible conformers (envelope, twist). Note, no angular momentum is generated by this motion. In these and related examples, a small displacement of the atomic positions leads to a loss of symmetry until the symmetric product re-forms (see image example below), where these displacements are typically along low-energy pathways. The Berry mechanism refers to the facile interconversion of axial and equatorial ligand in  types of compounds, e.g. D3h-symmetric  (shown). Finally, in a formal sense, the term pseudorotation is intended to refer exclusively to dynamics in symmetrical molecules, though mechanisms of the same type are invoked for lower symmetry molecules as well.

See also
 Bailar twist
 Ray–Dutt twist
 Bartell mechanism
 Fluxional molecule

References

Chemical bonding
Stereochemistry